Mamu Kanjan (also spelled Mamukanjan) is a town of Tandlianwala Tehsil in Faisalabad District in Punjab, Pakistan.

It was once known as Sandianwala. Later its name was changed to the name of the saint Peer Mamu Kanjan. His tomb is located at Bangla Road.

There is Bangla Chowk where from five roads lead: Kamalia road, Tandlianwala road, Muridwal road, Kilianwala-Sahiwal road and Bullay Shah road.

Crops of this area include watermelon, sugarcane, wheat, corn, and rice.

Education 
Both public and private colleges are available in Mamukanjan: Government Degree College for Women Mamukanjan and Government Degree College for Boys Mamukanjan are two public colleges, whereas some well-known private colleges are Oxford College Mamukanjan, Islamia Model College Mamukanjan and Colonel Abdul Rasheed School & College, Mamukanjan.

In addition, there is a ''Vocational Training Institute (VTI ) established by Punjab Vocational Training Council (PVTC), which is playing a pivotal role in poverty alleviation by imparting employable skills in different trades to the needy and deserving youth (both male and female ) of the area Mamukanjan.

Mamu Kanjan railway station 

Mamu Kanjan railway station is located in town of Mamu Kanjan, Faisalabad district, Pakistan.

Notable people
Muhammad Safdar Shakir, member Provincial Assembly of the Punjab from Mamukanjan (2018 - present)

References

Cities and towns in Faisalabad District